David Clarke (born 11 September 1970) is an English former footballer, went to New College Worcester - school for the blind and visually impaired, whose career spanned 17 years from 1995 to 2012 for the England and Great Britain blind football team.

Sports career
Clarke made 144 international appearances scoring 128 goals.

He was part of the British team which finished fifth in the 5-a-side at the 2008 Summer Paralympics. and he was selected as the Stadium torch bearer for the 2012 Summer Paralympics, where he was the first person to receive the torch in the Stadium, and passed it to the final torch bearer. He was a member of the 2012 Summer Paralympic blind-five-a-side Team GB football team. 
The following year he was guest of honour at the 2013 FA Cup Final between Manchester City and Wigan Athletic and handed the trophy over to his hometown team Wigan Athletic. He was inducted into the English Football Hall of Fame in September 2013. David received a lifetime achievement award at the FA England football awards in February 2013 and received an honorary doctorate from the University of Hertfordshire in November 2013.

References

1970 births
Living people
English footballers
English Football Hall of Fame inductees
Paralympic 5-a-side footballers of Great Britain
5-a-side footballers at the 2008 Summer Paralympics
5-a-side footballers at the 2012 Summer Paralympics
Association footballers not categorized by position